Parvathipuram or Parvatipuram may refer to:

Parvathipuram, Andhra Pradesh
Parvathipuram railway station
Parvathipuram Town railway station
Parvathipuram, Tamil Nadu
Parvathipuram (Lok Sabha constituency)